"In the Fire" is a song by British rapper Dave, featuring other British rappers such as Fredo, Meekz, Ghetts, Giggs, and Nathan James Tettey. It also features an intro and bridge from Milton Biggham of the Florida Mass Choir. It was released on July 23, 2021, by Dave and Neighbourhood Recordings on Dave's second studio album, We're All Alone in This Together.

Composition 
"In the Fire" is a British hip hop track with elements of UK drill and gospel music.

Personnel 
 Dave - vocals
 Fredo - vocals
 Meekz - vocals
 Ghetts - vocals
 Giggs - vocals
 Milton Biggham - sample
 Nathan James Tettey - outro

Charts

Certifications

References

2021 songs
Dave (rapper) songs